The 1942 Oregon Webfoots football team represented the University of Oregon in the Pacific Coast Conference (PCC) during the 1942 college football season.  In their first and only season under head coach John A. Warren, the Webfoots compiled a 2–6 record (2–5 in PCC, eighth), and were outscored 138 to 67.

Two home games were played on campus at Hayward Field in Eugene and two at Multnomah Stadium in Portland.

Schedule

References

External links
 Game program: Oregon at Washington State – October 3, 1942
 WSU Libraries: Game video (color) – Oregon at Washington State – October 3, 1942

Oregon
Oregon Ducks football seasons
Oregon Webfoots football